The Belarus women's national basketball represented Belarus in international women's basketball tournaments. The team is controlled by the Belarusian Basketball Federation.

After the 2022 Russian invasion of Ukraine, the FIBA suspended Belarus from participating in basketball and 3x3 basketball competitions.

Competitive record
Belarus was part of the Soviet Union until 1991.

Olympic Games

FIBA World Cup

EuroBasket

Current roster
Roster for the EuroBasket Women 2021.

3x3 team
Natallia Dashkevich and Maryna Ivashchanka both stand 1.90m (6ft 3in) and hence have a size advantage against most opponents.
Belarus finished with bronze at the 2019 European Games on home soil.

References

External links

FIBA profile

Women's national basketball teams
Basketball in Belarus
Basketball